István Vincze (born 22 January 1967) is a Hungarian football manager and former football player.

He made his debut for the Hungarian national team in 1986, and got 44 caps and 8 goals until 1996.

He played domestically for Tatabányai Bányász SC, Kispest Honvéd FC, BVSC Budapest, FC Tatabánya, Pécsi Mecsek and Vasas SC, as well as for Italian club U.S. Lecce, Belgian club Germinal Ekeren and Portuguese clubs S.C. Campomaiorense and C.D. Santa Clara.

References

External links

István Vincze Hungarian league stats at futball-adattar.hu 

1967 births
Living people
Hungarian footballers
Hungary international footballers
Hungary youth international footballers
Budapest Honvéd FC players
S.C. Campomaiorense players
C.D. Santa Clara players
Beerschot A.C. players
Vasas SC players
U.S. Lecce players
Nemzeti Bajnokság I players
Serie A players
Primeira Liga players
Belgian Pro League players
Hungarian expatriate footballers
Expatriate footballers in Belgium
Expatriate footballers in Portugal
Expatriate footballers in Italy
Hungarian expatriate sportspeople in Portugal
People from Tatabánya
Association football forwards
Puskás Akadémia FC managers
Hungarian football managers
Sportspeople from Komárom-Esztergom County